George H. Bishop (born 1937) is an American billionaire businessman. He is the founder and chief executive officer of GeoSouthern Energy, a petroleum and natural gas exploration company. In 2017, he was ranked #324 on the Forbes 400 list of the richest Americans and was ranked #814 on the list of the world's billionaires with a net worth of US$2.5 billion.

Early life and education
Bishop was born in 1937.

Career
Bishop founded GeoSouthern Energy, an oil company and serves as its Chief Executive Officer.

Bishop is also the owner of the Eagleford Restaurant in Cuero, Texas, where he has a ranch, and is an owner of the River Ridge Golf Club to the west of Houston.

Personal life
Bishop is married and resides in The Woodlands, Texas.

References

American company founders
American billionaires
People from The Woodlands, Texas
1937 births
Living people
Date of birth missing (living people)
Place of birth missing (living people)